Miaenia latia is a species of beetle in the family Cerambycidae. It was described by Blair in 1940.

References

Miaenia
Beetles described in 1940